This is a list of defunct state mental hospitals and schools in Massachusetts:

State hospitals 
 Boston State Hospital - demolished; now mixed-use
 Danvers State Hospital -   demolished due to recurring unexplainable fires in the west wing; its original staging has been repurposed into the building Avalon Bay at Danvers; admittance is no longer allowed; property is owned by Avalon Condominium Company
 Foxborough State Hospital - half demolished; condominiums
 Gaebler Children's Center - demolished; land labeled as a park
 Gardner State Hospital - buildings converted into prison
 Grafton State Hospital - admittance not permitted; owned by the state; MPs patrol frequently; one must work at Job Corps in order to gain admittance
 Medfield State Hospital - standing, allowed to walk grounds from dawn till dusk, no admittance in buildings
 Metropolitan State Hospital - mostly demolished for condominiums; one building remains abandoned on the property and one was rehabilitated into condominiums
 Northampton State Hospital - demolished; empty field
 Pondville State Hospital - partly demolished; part converted into Caritas Southwood Community Hospital, also defunct
 Rutland Heights State Hospital - demolished; land unused; future unknown
 Taunton State Hospital - hospital demolished; other buildings active; future unknown
 Lovering Colony - demolished; land unused
 Simeon E. Borden (Raynham Farm) Colony - demolished; land in use by the town of Raynham
 Westborough State Hospital - currently being demolished for condominiums
 Worcester State Hospital - 95% demolished; Hooper Turret and Woodward Building (end of left wing) remain as of October 2014. The clock tower was demolished in 2012, to make way for a parking lot. A replica of the clocktower was later rebuilt (in the same spot) as a tribute to the old Worcester State Hospital. The new clock tower is visible from Route 9 West in downtown Shrewsbury, MA near the Shrewsbury/Worcester town line or from Clocktower Drive in Worcester MA.

State schools 
 Belchertown State School - partially demolished
 JT Berry State School - demolished
 Monson Developmental Center - partially disused; future unknown
 Paul A. Dever State School - demolished 
 Templeton Developmental Center - partially disused; future unknown
 Walter E. Fernald Developmental Center - officially closed as of November 14 2014; partially active, in process of construction/demolition
 Wrentham State School - partially disused

Sanitariums 
 Attleboro Sanitarium - demolished 
 Berkshire Hills Sanitarium
 Lakeville State Hospital - unused, patrolled frequently by city police
 Middlesex County Sanitarium
 Middleton Sanitarium
 Worcester County Sanitarium - demolished 
 Cranberry Specialty Hospital - demolished in 2017

Reform schools 
 Lyman School for Boys - disused; parts of the property now house businesses, medical office, a park, and a courthouse
 State Reform School for Boys - disused; occupied by Westborough State Hospital in 1884, land owned by town of Westborough

Private institutions 
 Adams-Nervine Asylum - repurposed 
 Massachusetts Mental Health Center - demolished and rebuilt. Reopened in 2012
 Westwood Lodge Hospital - closed

External links
 . (Various documents).

Healthcare in Massachusetts
Defunct state mental facilities
Massachusetts